Clarence Madison Dally (1865– October 2, 1904) was an American glassblower, noted as an assistant to Thomas Edison in his work on X-rays and as an early victim of radiation dermatitis and its complications.

Early life and education 
Clarence Dally was born in Woodbridge, New Jersey, one of four brothers. He enlisted in the United States Navy at the age of seventeen, and served for six years.

Glassblowing 
After obtaining an honorable discharge he went to work at the Edison Lamp Works in Harrison with his father and brothers as a glassblower. Around 1890 he moved to the Edison Laboratory in West Orange to assist in experiments with the incandescent lamp.

Working with Edison 
Dally was a favored employee of Thomas Edison. He was entrusted to help demonstrate Edison's new fluoroscopic machine at the 1896 National Electric Light Association exhibition.

Edison X-ray focus tube 
Following Röntgen's work on X-rays in 1895, Clarence and his brother Charles worked on the development of the Edison X-ray focus tube, developing the fluoroscope using calcium tungstate. The Edison fluoroscope produced sharper images than the Röntgen fluoroscope, which used barium platinocyanide. At the time, the levels of X-rays produced were not believed to be dangerous. However, Edison noted how "the x-ray had affected poisonously my assistant, Mr. Dally."

Radiation effects 
By 1900, Clarence Dally was suffering radiation damage to his hands and face sufficient to require time off work. Due to him being right handed, he used his left to test the beam from the machine. This caused his left hand to be affected before his right.  In 1902, one lesion on his left wrist was treated unsuccessfully with multiple skin grafts and eventually his left hand was amputated. An ulceration on his right hand necessitated the amputation of four fingers.

These procedures failed to halt the progression of his carcinoma, and despite the amputation of his arms at the elbow and shoulder, he died from mediastinal cancer. Dally is thought to be the first American to die from the effects of experimentation with radiation. Following this, Thomas Edison abandoned his research on X-rays. In 1903, Edison said "Don't talk to me about X-rays;  I am afraid of them."

Personal life 
Dally was survived by his wife and two sons.

See also
Nuclear labor issues
List of civilian radiation accidents

References

Further reading

"Edison fears hidden perils of the x-rays", New York World, Monday, August 3, 1903, page 1

1865 births
1904 deaths
American amputees
People from Woodbridge Township, New Jersey
Projectional radiography
Deaths from cancer in New Jersey
Glassblowers
Scientists with disabilities